The 2012 Ulster Senior Club Football Championship was the 45th instalment of the annual competition organised by Ulster GAA. It was one of the four provincial competitions of the 2012–13 All-Ireland Senior Club Football Championship.

Crossmaglen Rangers of Armagh were the defending champions, having defeated Down champions Burren in the 2011 final.

Crossmaglen successfully defended their title after beating Down's Kilcoo in the final.

Teams
The Ulster championship is contested by the winners of the nine county championships in the Irish province of Ulster. Ulster comprises the six counties of Northern Ireland, as well as Cavan, Donegal and Monaghan in the Republic of Ireland.

Bracket

Preliminary round

Quarter-finals

Semi-finals

Final

Championship statistics

Top scorers
Overall

In a single game

References

Ulster Senior Club Football Championship
2012 in Northern Ireland sport
Ulster Senior Club Championship